Belle-Isle-en-Terre is a commune in the Côtes-d'Armor department of Brittany in northwestern France.
Belle isle - in modern French - Belle île meaning "beautiful island" and en Terre significate "on the ground".

Population

Inhabitants of Belle-Isle-en-Terre are called Bellilois in French.

Breton language
The municipality launched a linguistic plan through Ya d'ar brezhoneg on November 26, 2007.

In 2008, 28.46% of primary school children attended bilingual schools.

See also
Communes of the Côtes-d'Armor department

References

External links

Communes of Côtes-d'Armor